James Howard Goodnight (born January 6, 1943) is an American billionaire businessman and software developer. He has been the CEO of SAS Institute since 1976, which he co-founded that year with other faculty members of North Carolina State University. As of February 2022, his net worth was estimated at US$7.3 billion.

Early life and career
Goodnight was born to Albert Goodnight and Dorothy Patterson in Salisbury, North Carolina, on January 6, 1943. He lived in Greensboro until he was 12, when his family moved to Wilmington. As a kid he worked at his father's hardware store.

Goodnight's career with computers began with a computer course at North Carolina State University. One summer he got a job writing software programs for the agricultural economics department. Goodnight was a member of the Beta-Beta chapter of Tau Kappa Epsilon at NC State, and contributed to the construction of a new fraternity house for the chapter in 2002.

Goodnight received a master's degree in statistics in 1968. He also worked at a company building electronic equipment for the ground stations that communicated with the Apollo space capsules. While working on the Apollo program, Goodnight experienced a work environment with a high turnover rate and this shaped his views on corporate culture. Goodnight returned to North Carolina State University after working on the Apollo project, where he earned a PhD in statistics and was a faculty member from 1972 to 1976.

Career

Goodnight joined another faculty at North Carolina State in a research project to create a general purpose statistical analysis system (SAS) for analyzing agricultural data. The project was operated by a consortium of eight land-grant universities and funded primarily by the USDA. Goodnight along with another faculty member Anthony James Barr became project leaders for the development of the early version of SAS. When the software had 100 customers in 1976, Goodnight and three others from the University left the college to form SAS Institute in an office across the street.

Goodnight remained CEO of SAS Institute for more than 35 years as the company grew from $138,000 its first year in business, to $420 million in 1993 and $2.43 billion by 2010. Under his leadership, the company grew each year. Goodnight became known for creating and defending SAS' corporate culture, often described by the media as "utopian." He rejected acquisition offers and chose against going public to protect the company's work environment. Goodnight has maintained a flat organizational structure with about 27 people who report directly to him and three organizational layers.

HSM Global described Goodnight's leadership style in a framework of three pillars: "help employees do their best work by keeping them intellectually challenged and by removing distractions; Make managers responsible for sparking creativity; eliminate arbitrary distinctions between 'suits' and 'creatives'; Engage customers as creative partners to help deliver superior products."

In 1981, Goodnight was elected as a Fellow of the American Statistical Association. In 1997, he received the Golden Plate Award of the American Academy of Achievement.
In 2004, he was named a Great American Business Leader by Harvard. That same year he was named one of America's 25 Most Fascinating Entrepreneurs by Inc. Magazine. He has also been a frequent speaker and participant at the World Economic Forum.

In March 2020, Jim Goodnight was awarded a CEO Great Place to Work For All Leadership Award by Great Place to Work.

Personal life
Goodnight met his wife, Ann, while he was a senior at North Carolina State University and she was attending Meredith College. They have been married approximately five decades and have three children. Goodnight's net worth was $7.3 billion, as of February 2022.

Goodnight has an interest in improving the state of education, particularly elementary and secondary education. In 1996, Goodnight and his wife, along with his business partner, John Sall and his wife Ginger, founded an independent prep school Cary Academy. Both of the Goodnights are also involved in the local Cary, NC, community. He owns Prestonwood Country Club and The Umstead Hotel and Spa situated on the edge of the SAS campus.

See also
 List of Americans by net worth
 List of Tau Kappa Epsilon brothers
 Prestonwood Country Club

References

Further reading

External links

 Goodnight's official Bio

1943 births
American billionaires
American technology chief executives
American humanitarians
American statisticians
Businesspeople in software
Living people
Businesspeople from North Carolina
North Carolina State University alumni
People from Cary, North Carolina
People from Salisbury, North Carolina
Fellows of the American Statistical Association
Activists from North Carolina